Memor (died c. 262) was a usurper against the Roman Emperor Gallienus.

Memor or MEMOR may also refer to:

 Euchontha memor, a moth of the family Notodontidae
 Lucius Marcius Memor, a Roman haruspex
 MEMOR, a rail safety system used in Belgium in conjunction with Répétition des Signaux, see Belgian railway signalling
Memor II+, a train protection system used in Luxembourg
Memor was the Italian name of Transformers character Soundwave